WGYN was a radio station that last broadcast at 97.9 MHz FM in New York City. It operated from December 1941 to May 1950. Studios and transmitter were located at the Cities Service Building at 70 Pine Street.

History
The Muzak Corporation built and signed on W47NY, operating at 44.7 MHz, in December 1941. The station aired an entirely musical format with news flashes from United Press. Muzak also obtained a permit to operate experimentally on 117.65 MHz to provide a fee-based service of background music, similar to its wire-delivered offering. As with all of the first FM call signs, the designation represented the location (New York) and its position on the dial in the FM band of the time, at 44.7 megahertz. W47NY originated programs that aired over other FM stations in the northeastern United States, known together as the "American Network". Its director, Palmer K. Leberman, was a captain in the Navy, president of Seattle radio station KRSC, and applicant for a New York television station.

When the FCC changed the alphanumeric call signs of early FM stations out for more typical four-letter designations in October 1943, W47NY became WGYN. Two years later, it was assigned 96.1 MHz as part of the move of the FM band up to 88–108 MHz. It was the first station in New York to begin test transmissions in the new band. Operating in the early days of FM, WGYN was blamed for—and found to not be the source of—interference to instrument landing system equipment on aircraft at LaGuardia Airport. Another reallocation of FM—adopting 800 kHz channel spacing—saw WGYN move to its final dial position of 97.9 in 1947.

In 1947, Muzak divested itself of WGYN and sold its stake to the other investors in the station, Charles E. Merrill and Leberman's Radio Sales Corporation. WGYN went off the air in May 1950 due to unprofitable operations over its entire existence: Leberman described its financial situation as "pouring good money in the soup". After ceasing operations, the Multiplex Development Corporation used the WGYN facilities in its tests of subcarrier multiplexing over FM stations, using the experimental call sign of KE2XKH.

References

GYN
1941 establishments in New York City
1950 disestablishments in New York (state)
Radio stations established in 1941
Radio stations disestablished in 1950
GYN
Defunct radio stations in the United States